Princess Maria Pia of Bourbon-Two Sicilies may refer to:

 Princess Maria Pia of Bourbon-Two Sicilies (1849–1882), daughter of Ferdinand II of the Two Sicilies and Maria Theresa of Austria
 Princess Maria di Grazia of Bourbon-Two Sicilies (1878–1973) (or "Maria Pia"), daughter of Prince Alfonso, Count of Caserta and Princess Antonietta of Bourbon-Two Sicilies